Arriana is a municipality in the Rhodope regional unit, Greece. The seat of the municipality is in Fillyra.

Municipality
The municipality Arriana was formed at the 2011 local government reform by the merger of the following 4 former municipalities, that became municipal units:
Arriana
Fillyra
Kechros
Organi

The municipality has an area of 771.175 km2, the municipal unit 178.391 km2.

References

Municipalities of Eastern Macedonia and Thrace
Populated places in Rhodope (regional unit)